The SS Mareeba was an Australian freighter built in 1921 and named after the town of Mareeba in Far North Queensland, Australia. She was a 3,472-ton Australasian United Steam Navigation Company vessel.

The Mareeba was attacked and sunk in the Bay of Bengal on 26 June 1941 by the German auxiliary cruiser Kormoran. She was carrying 5000 tons of sugar from Batavia to Colombo when she picked up the Yugoslav freighter Velebit's distress signal. Instead of immediately stopping the Mareeba radioed her position and ran for it, presumably because at 8 o'clock that morning she had spotted the British light cruiser HMS Durban, in the Ten Degree Channel. She received nine shots to her hull, several of which hit her engine-room, and, although she was slowly sinking, it took a team of German boarding party placing demolitions to sink her quickly. It would later be said that the Mareeba would have made a fine auxiliary minelayer because of her durability. All 48 of the crew of the Mareeba were captured and spirited away on the Kormoran which travelled at top speed through the night and most of the following day to avoid retaliation for the sinkings.

Crew 
The captured crew stayed on the Kormoran for a total of 103 days where they were housed in the fore part of the ship below the waterline. They slept in hammocks and were allowed on deck daily. After the 103 days, they were transferred to the German supply ship Kulmerland, where, after 15 days, the prisoners were transferred to the German prison ship Spreewald.

References

External links 
 Hand Drawn Image of the SS Mareeba 

Cargo ships of Australia
International maritime incidents
Maritime incidents in June 1941
World War II shipwrecks in the Indian Ocean
1921 ships
Shipwrecks in the Bay of Bengal